Melton Halt railway station was a worker's station built on the Hull and Selby line near Melton. The halt was built for works trains to and from the Humber Portland Cement Company's works (Humber Cement Works), and operated from 1920 to 1989.

History
In June 1920 the North Eastern Railway was approached by the Humber Portland Cement Company with a request for a station halt for their new works near Melton. The company offered to pay the construction costs, and guaranteed a minimum number of tickets to be purchased.

The halt was located at the "Melton Crossing" level crossing. The initial halt was a two platform station with the platforms on the slow lines of the quadruple track at the crossing. The halt opened in October 1920, and was originally named Melton Crossing Halt.

The station was renamed Melton Halt by British Railways by February 1965. In 1970 after the one of the tracks was removed (Hull slow) a new platform was constructed.

The station was closed by British Rail on 10 July 1989.

Potential Reopening

In June 2019, it was revealed that Hull Local Enterprise Partnership were looking at reopening the station as a major parkway station for InterCity services next to Melton West Business Park and the A63 road. If plans come to fruition it would be the first station to open in East Yorkshire for over 100 years.

References

Sources

External links
Disused Stations: Melton Halt

Disused railway stations in the East Riding of Yorkshire
Former North Eastern Railway (UK) stations
Railway stations in Great Britain opened in 1920
Railway stations in Great Britain closed in 1989